Christene Browne (born 1965 in Saint Kitts) is a Canadian director and writer. Browne is the first black woman to write, produce and direct a feature film in Canada.

Biography
Born in St. Kitts in the Caribbean, Browne moved with her family to Canada in 1970. She spent her formative years in Regent Park, Canada's oldest and largest low-income community. It was in this Toronto community where the seeds of Browne's filmmaker career were planted. She participated and then led the Regent Park Video workshop project and contributed to the production of many documentary videos about the community. It was during this time Browne decided to go to film school. She attended the film program at Ryerson Polytechnic Institute. After leaving Ryerson, she worked for a small film company before starting her own production company, Syncopated Productions in 1990.

Her first two films, Brothers in Music and No Choices (a segment of movie Five Feminist Minutes), debuted at the Toronto International Film Festival in 1991 and launched Browne's film career. From that time onward, she has consistently produced heartfelt work that has tackled hard-hitting difficult topics such as poverty and abortion. She has worked independently and has also done projects with the National Film Board of Canada and the Canadian Broadcast Corporation, OMNI TV and many others. Her films have won numerous awards and have been screened and broadcast all over the world. In 1999, Browne completed her first dramatic feature, Another Planet, and became the first Black woman to direct and write a feature film in Canada. Most recently, Browne completed Speaking in Tongues: The History of Language, an extensive documentary series that looks at the history of language from prehistoric time to the present day, for which she received the Women's International Film & Television Showcase (WIFTS) Foundation Best Documentary Award 2011.

In addition to working as filmmaker, Browne has also worked as curator and media arts instructor.

Browne's first novel, Two Women, a cautionary tale about two women who share the same soul, was released in 2013.

References

External links

Official website

Saint Kitts and Nevis emigrants to Canada
Canadian women film directors
Film producers from Ontario
Toronto Metropolitan University alumni
Film directors from Toronto
Writers from Toronto
Living people
1965 births
Black Canadian filmmakers
Canadian women film producers
20th-century Canadian screenwriters
21st-century Canadian screenwriters
21st-century Canadian novelists
Canadian women novelists
Black Canadian women
Black Canadian writers
20th-century Canadian women writers